

A
 Emerson Andelin
 Robert Wilson Andrews 
 Jacques Arago

B
 Edward Bailey
 Robert C. Barnfield 
 Charles W. Bartlett 
 Don Blanding
 Esther Bruton
 George Henry Burgess

C
 Jean Charlot
 Nicholas Chevalier 
 Patrick Ching
 Louis Choris 
 Henry B. Christian
 Ernest William Christmas 
 Edward Clifford 
 William F. Cogswell 
 William A. Coulter

D
 Robert Dampier 
 Stanislas Darondeau 
 Gideon Jacques Denny 
 Helen Thomas Dranga

E
 Edward M. Eggleston
 Arthur Webster Emerson
 Paul Emmert
 Robert Lee Eskridge

F
 Hugo Anton Fisher 
 Cornelia MacIntyre Foley
 Juliette May Fraser
 Charles Furneaux

G
 Margarete Garvin Gillin 
 René Gillotin 
 Constance Gordon-Cumming 
 Alfred Richard Gurrey, Sr.

H
 Arthur Trevor Haddon 
 John Hayter 
 Ruehl Frederick Heckman
 Hon Chew Hee 
 Theodore Heuck 
 D. Howard Hitchcock
 Hiroshi Honda
 Grace Hudson

I
 Ogura Yonesuke Itoh

J
 Arthur Johnsen
 Ejler Andreas Jorgensen

K
 Kaʻiulani 
 Herb Kawainui Kāne
 John Melville Kelly

L
 John LaFarge
 Huc-Mazelet Luquiens
 Genevieve Springston Lynch

M
 Alexander Samuel MacLeod
 Arman Manookian 
 Frank Montague Moore

N
 Joseph Nāwahī 
 Ben Norris

O
 Georgia O'Keeffe
 Hajime Okuda (1906-1992)

P
 Ambrose McCarthy Patterson
 Titian Peale
 Agnes Lawrence Pelton
 Enoch Wood Perry, Jr. 
 Louis Pohl 
 Horatio Nelson Poole
 John Prendergast
 Gene Pressler

R
 Shirley Ximena Hopper Russell

S
 Matteo Sandona 
 Eugene Savage
 James Gay Sawkins 
 Alexander Scott 
 Eduardo Lefebvre Scovell 
 Lloyd Sexton, Jr.
 Joseph Henry Sharp
 Susan Louise Shatter 
 Allen Sheppard
 Ken Shutt 
 William Fulton Soare
 John Mix Stanley 
 Joseph Dwight Strong 
 Kelly Sueda

T
 Augustus Vincent Tack
 Reuben Tam
 Jules Tavernier
 Persis Goodale Thurston Taylor 
 Madge Tennent 
 John Paul Thomas
 William Pinkney Toler 
 George Burroughs Torrey 
 William Twigg-Smith 
 Ralph Burke Tyree

V
 Hubert Vos

W
 Lionel Walden 
 John Webber 
 Bessie Wheeler 
 Henry Otto Wix 
 Anna Woodward 
 Theodore Wores

Y
 John Chin Young

See also
 :Category:Painters from Hawaii
 List of artists who made prints of Hawaii and its people
 List of artists who sculpted Hawaii and its people

Footnotes

 Sculptors
 Sculptors
Hawaii
artists who painted Hawaii and its people